The first annual Australian Independent Record Labels Association Music Awards (generally known as the AIR Awards) was an award ceremony in Australia on 29 November 2006 to honour outstanding achievements in sales by Australian independent artists.

The shortlisted nominees for AIR Awards were announced in October 2006, with the sponsor of V energy drinks.

Performers
Gotye
The Basics

Nominees and winners

AIR Awards
Winners are listed first and highlighted in boldface; other final nominees are listed alphabetically by artists' first name.

See also
Music of Australia

References

2006 in Australian music
2006 music awards
AIR Awards